Pancho Prin (born Francisco de Paula Prin Villegas: April 2, 1930 in Cúa, Venezuela) was a Venezuelan musician, singer, and composer.  His better known songs include "El Gavilán pollero," "Canto al Amanecer Tuyero," "La Madrugada llanera," "El Aguardiente" and "Atardecer Mirandino."

See also 
Venezuelan music

Sources 

1930 births
2003 deaths
People from Cúa
Venezuelan composers
Male composers
Venezuelan folk singers
20th-century Venezuelan male singers